HNLMS K 1 may refer to one of three ships of the Royal Netherlands Navy named K 1 or K I:

  (1914), a unique submarine
 ,  sloop, captured by the Germans and commissioned in to the Kriegsmarine

Royal Netherlands Navy ship names